The Saturday Knights are a Seattle and Tacoma, Washington-based musical group whose music spans many genres, ranging from hip hop to pop music. Their debut full-length CD, Mingle (2008) features guest appearances from the Dap-Kings, Chris Ballew, Jack Endino, Holly Deye (the bassist from Lillydale), Kim Thayil, and Jim Horn & the Muscle Shoals Horns. This crew of guest artists allowed them to recreate samples they wanted to use on this album but could not for legal reasons.

Its members go by the names Tilson, Barfly, and DJ Suspence (Spencer Manio). The group originally included multi-instrumentalist Brian Weber (ex-Dub Narcotic Sound System), who went by the name of "B-Web" and who left the group shortly before their 2007 South by Southwest appearance.

A June 2007 piece in the Seattle Times states that the "genre-flouting" group have been praised by virtually all media in Seattle who cover popular music, but have yet to get geographically broader attention, partly (it conjectures) because their 2007 appearance at South by Southwest in Austin, Texas has been their only non-Seattle-area performance to date.

Members

 Barfly - vocals
 Tilson - vocals
 DJ Suspence (Spencer Manio) - beats

Discography
 The Saturday Knights, Light In The Attic Records (2007), 4-song EP
 Mingle, Light In The Attic Records (2008), full-length CD

References

External links

 Light In The Attic Records band page
 Myspace page
 Andrew Matson, Live from Seattle, The Saturday Knights, Seattle Times, February 3, 2008 includes 10 photos.

American hip hop groups
American pop music groups
Light In The Attic Records artists